Australogyra is a genus of cnidarians belonging to the family Faviidae.

The species of this genus are found in Southerneast Asia and Australia.

Species:
 Australogyra zelli (Veron, Pichon & Best, 1977)

References

Merulinidae
Scleractinia genera